Possibility theory is a mathematical theory for dealing with certain types of uncertainty and is an alternative to probability theory. It uses measures of possibility and necessity between 0 and 1, ranging from impossible to possible and unnecessary to necessary, respectively. Professor Lotfi Zadeh first introduced possibility theory in 1978 as an extension of his theory of fuzzy sets and fuzzy logic. Didier Dubois and Henri Prade further contributed to its development. Earlier in the 1950s, economist G. L. S. Shackle proposed the min/max algebra to describe degrees of potential surprise.

Formalization of possibility
For simplicity, assume that the universe of discourse Ω is a finite set.

Axiom 1: 

Axiom 2: 

It follows that, like probability, the possibility measure is determined by its behavior on singletons:

Axiom 1 can be interpreted as the assumption that Ω is an exhaustive description of future states of the world, because it means that no belief weight is given to elements outside Ω.

Technically, it implies that there is at least one element in Ω with possibility 1.

Axiom 3 corresponds to the additivity axiom in probabilities. However there is an important practical difference. Possibility theory is computationally more convenient because Axioms 1–3 imply that:

Because one can know the possibility of the union from the possibility of each component, it can be said that possibility is compositional with respect to the union operator. Note however that it is not compositional with respect to the intersection operator. Generally:

When Ω is not finite, Axiom 3 can be replaced by:

For all index sets , if the subsets  are pairwise disjoint,

Necessity

Whereas probability theory uses a single number, the probability, to describe how likely an event is to occur, possibility theory uses two concepts, the possibility and the necessity of the event. For any set , the necessity measure is defined by

It is straightforward to show that:

 for any 

and that:

Note that contrary to probability theory, possibility is not self-dual. That is, for any event , we only have the inequality:

However, the following duality rule holds:

For any event , either , or 

Accordingly, beliefs about an event can be represented by a number and a bit.

Interpretation
There are four cases that can be interpreted as follows:

 means that  is necessary.  is certainly true. It implies that .

 means that  is impossible.  is certainly false. It implies that .

 means that  is possible. I would not be surprised at all if  occurs. It leaves  unconstrained.

 means that  is unnecessary. I would not be surprised at all if  does not occur. It leaves  unconstrained.

Because it allows for indeterminacy like this, possibility theory relates to the graduation of a many-valued logic, such as intuitionistic logic, rather than the classical two-valued logic.

Note that unlike possibility, fuzzy logic is compositional with respect to both the union and the intersection operator. The relationship with fuzzy theory can be explained with the following classical example.

 Fuzzy logic: When a bottle is half full, it can be said that the level of truth of the proposition "The bottle is full" is 0.5. The word "full" is seen as a fuzzy predicate describing the amount of liquid in the bottle.
 Possibility theory: There is one bottle, either completely full or totally empty. The proposition "the possibility level that the bottle is full is 0.5" describes a degree of belief. One way to interpret 0.5 in that proposition is to define its meaning as: I am ready to bet that it's empty as long as the odds are even (1:1) or better, and I would not bet at any rate that it's full.

Possibility theory as an imprecise probability theory
There is an extensive formal correspondence between probability and possibility theories, where the addition operator corresponds to the maximum operator.

A possibility measure can be seen as a consonant plausibility measure in Dempster–Shafer theory of evidence. The operators of possibility theory can be seen as a hyper-cautious version of the operators of the transferable belief model, a modern development of the theory of evidence.

Possibility can be seen as an upper probability: any possibility distribution defines a unique credal set set of admissible probability distributions by

This allows one to study possibility theory using the tools of imprecise probabilities.

Necessity logic
We call generalized possibility every function satisfying Axiom 1 and Axiom 3. We call generalized necessity the dual of a generalized possibility. The generalized necessities are related with a very simple and interesting fuzzy logic called necessity logic. In the deduction apparatus of necessity logic the logical axioms are the usual classical tautologies. Also, there is only a fuzzy inference rule extending the usual modus ponens. Such a rule says that if α and α → β are proved at degree λ and μ, respectively, then we can assert β at degree min{λ,μ}. It is easy to see that the theories of such a logic are the generalized necessities and that the completely consistent theories coincide with the necessities (see for example Gerla 2001).

See also
Fuzzy measure theory
Logical possibility
Modal logic
Probabilistic logic
Random-fuzzy variable
Transferable belief model
Upper and lower probabilities

References
Dubois, Didier and Prade, Henri, "Possibility Theory, Probability Theory and Multiple-valued Logics: A Clarification", Annals of Mathematics and Artificial Intelligence 32:35–66, 2002.
Gerla Giangiacomo, Fuzzy logic: Mathematical Tools for Approximate Reasoning, Kluwer Academic Publishers, Dordrecht 2001.
Ladislav J. Kohout, "Theories of Possibility: Meta-Axiomatics and Semantics", Fuzzy Sets and Systems 25:357-367, 1988.
Zadeh, Lotfi, "Fuzzy Sets as the Basis for a Theory of Possibility", Fuzzy Sets and Systems 1:3–28, 1978. (Reprinted in Fuzzy Sets and Systems 100 (Supplement): 9–34, 1999.)
Brian R. Gaines and Ladislav J. Kohout, "Possible Automata", in Proceedings of the International Symposium on Multiple-Valued Logic, pp. 183-192, Bloomington, Indiana, May 13-16, 1975.
Probability theory
Fuzzy logic
Possibility